The Stone Soup Coffeehouse is a coffeehouse based in Rhode Island. It is one of the oldest folk music venues in Southern New England.  After many years in Pawtucket, Stone Soup returns to Providence September 2019.  Shows will be at the Music Mansion on 88 Meeting Street. 

Founded in 1980, it has presented concerts by artists such as Catie Curtis, Pete Seeger, Patty Larkin, Ellis Paul, The Low Anthem, Northern Lights, Holly Near, and Marshall Crenshaw. And continues to present a mix of national and local artists.

In 2003, it had to ask for donations for the first time; prior to that, they had been able to support themselves on admission fees.

References

External links
 

Music venues in Rhode Island
1980 establishments in Rhode Island